Ingham may refer to:

Places

Antarctica
 Ingham Glacier, a contributing glacier of Borchgrevink Glacier, Victory Mountains, Victoria Land

Australia
 Ingham, Queensland, a town and locality
 Ingham railway station, Queensland

England
 Ingham, Lincolnshire, a village and civil parish
 Ingham, Norfolk, a village and civil parish
 Ingham, Suffolk, a village and civil parish
 Ingham railway station

United States
 Ingham County, Michigan
 Ingham Township, Michigan
 Ingham, Nebraska, a ghost town
 Ingham, Ohio, a ghost town
 Ingham, Virginia, an unincorporated community

People
 Ingham (surname)
 Ingham Brooke (1836–1906), Anglican Archdeacon of Halifax, England

Ships
 , a United States Coast Guard cutter preserved as a memorial ship
 , a United States Coast Guard cutter currently contracted for construction
 , a United States Revenue Cutter Service schooner
 , a United States Revenue Cutter Service schooner

Other uses
 Ingham University, Le Roy, New York, first women's college in New York State and first chartered women's university in the United States
 RAF Cammeringham, formerly RAF Ingham, a former Royal Air Force station used by RAF Bomber Command and the Polish Air Force during the Second World War

See also
 Ingham Academy High School (Michigan), an alternative high school in Lansing, Michigan, United States
 Aston Ingham, Herefordshire, England
 Inghams Enterprises, an Australian poultry supplier
 Ingram (disambiguation)
 Ingraham (disambiguation)